"Offer It Up" is a song by Australian singer songwriter Kate Miller-Heidke and released in Germany in July 2014 as the third and final single from Miller-Heidke's fourth studio album, O Vertigo!. The song received a physical release in the UK to promote her album and tour in September 2014.

Critical reception
New Reviews said that her vocals were "gentle and delicious", and worked well with the subtle beat.

Lyric video
In 2014, a lyric video appeared on Miller-Heidke's YouTube channel. It is very basic, featuring the lyrics in white on a black background and white flashes of light to swap between slides. As of 27 January 2019, the video has over 30,000 views.

Track listing
CD single
 "Offer It Up" - 3:45

Digital download
 "Offer It Up" - 3:45

References

Kate Miller-Heidke songs
2014 songs
Songs written by Keir Nuttall
Songs written by Kate Miller-Heidke
Cooking Vinyl singles